Ministry of Youth and Sports of Ukraine is a government of Ukraine ministry established on 6 June 1991 after reorganization of the Soviet State Committee of the Ukrainian SSR in affairs of youth and sports. As a ministerial government department, it exists with some breaks since 1991. It was reestablished again in 2013 by splitting away from the Ministry of Education and Science where it existed as its subdepartment in 2010–2013.

The Honcharuk Government (on 29 August 2019) merged the ministry with the Ministry of Culture. But its succeeding Shmyhal Government undid this merge. The Minister of Youth and sports is former Olympic champion fencer Vadim Gutzeit.

History
The ministry of youth and sports was first created in 1991 when two state committees of physical culture and sports and another of youth (minor) affairs were merged. In 1996 the organ was split again until 2000. In 2000 the two agencies were merged again along with the state committee of tourism for less than a year. In 2005 the ministry of youth and sports was reestablished again and later was joined with another agency the ministry of family and minors' affairs.

In 1997–2005 the organ was a state committee, in 2010-2013 - a state service.

In 2010 the Government of Ukraine led by Party of Regions in populistic way arrogantly announced about reorganization of its hierarchy making the newly elected President of Ukraine Viktor Yanukovych a big reformist when the consolidated ministry was merged again with the Ministry of Education and Science for the next three years, while agency for sports was degraded to the state service of youth and sports. Finally in 2013 the state service again was given the ministerial portfolio.

The agency in charge of tourism was oscillated and renamed in 2001 as the State Tourism Administration and later was transferred to the Ministry of Culture in 2004.

In December 2001 a committee chairman Maria Bulatova in interview to Mirror Weekly explained that since the independence of Ukraine, the provision for the state institution was de facto copy-pasted from similar institution of the Ukrainian SSR and without even considering the fact that its development strategy was forming out of Moscow by the Central Committee of the Communist Party of the Soviet Union and State Committee of Sport of the Soviet Union.

Leadership

Heads of Family and Children
Ministry of Family Affairs and Youth was established in 1996 by merging two committees of Women Affairs, Motherhood, and Minors and another of Youth (Minors) Affairs with Ministry on Youth Affairs and Sports.

Heads of Sports

See also
 Ministry of Education and Science of Ukraine

Notes

References

External links
 Official website

Youth and Sports
Youth and Sports
Ukraine, Youth and Sports
Ukraine
Ukraine
Ukraine
Ukraine
Ukraine
1991 establishments in Ukraine
Women in Ukraine
Youth in Ukraine